Mineola is a city in the U.S. state of Texas in Wood County. It lies 26 miles north of Tyler. Its population was 4,823 at the 2020 census.

The town was incorporated as the railroads arrived in 1873. A railroad official, Ira H. Evans, combined the names of his daughter, Ola, and her friend, Minnie Patten, to create the city name Mineola.

History
Mineola came into existence when the railroads built lines through the eastern part of the state. In 1873, the Texas and Pacific and the International-Great Northern raced to see which could get to Mineola first. The I-GN reached the finish 15 minutes earlier. A city government was organized in 1873, a post office opened in 1875, and the town was incorporated in 1877, but a fire in the 1880s destroyed 18 buildings. The town's oldest paper, the Mineola Monitor, was founded in 1876. By 1890, the town had seven churches, several schools including a black free school, hotels, banks. In 1895, Mineola became the site of the Wood County Fair.

Since Mineola was in the heart of the East Texas timber belt, timber was plentiful for making railroad ties and lumber. Mineola provided most of the ties to complete the T&P RR west to El Paso in 1879; S. Zuckerman, a Mineola resident, filled contracts for 85,000 ties that were used in the construction. During the community's first 60 years, farm products included cotton, livestock, fruit, and berries. A chair factory opened in 1886, became a crate and basket factory in 1900, and operated until 1952. Highway improvement, the Magnolia Pipeline Company gas line, and the establishment of a railroad terminal caused growth during the 1920s, and the discovery of oil in parts of Wood County and construction of a T&P railroad shop spurred the economy during the 1940s. Diversified farming gave way to cattle raising and watermelon crops by 1950. The Mineola Watermelon Festival began in 1948. Subsequently, sweet-potato farming, a creamery, a nursery, and a company that supplies poles and pulpwood to the telephone company helped the economy.

The town remains a shipping center. The Mineola Memorial Library, largely financed by H. W. Meredith, was completed in 1960. Nearby Lake Holbrook, also completed in 1962, attracts residents and visitors. The Meredith Foundation has provided large sums for educational and cultural purposes since 1962. Meredith Hall Civic Center, completed in 1977, is used by large and small groups for varied events. The manufacture of women's clothing, sporting goods, electronic connectors, fertilizer, and cattle feed, and the packaging of dry beans and meat provide employment for many people. A new city hall complex was completed in 1986, and a two-school facility was completed in 1987.

Geography

Climate 
Mineola enjoys weather typical of East Texas, which is unpredictable, especially in the spring. Mineola's humid subtropical climate is typical of the Southeast United States.

Demographics

As of the 2020 United States census, there were 4,823 people, 1,686 households, and 1,021 families residing in the city. The 2,086 housing units averaged . Of the 1,686 households, 29.2% had children under the age of 18 living with them, 50.6% were married couples living together, 12.6% had a female householder with no husband present, and 32.7% were not families. About 30.1% were made up of individuals, and 17.3% had someone living alone who was 65  or older. The average household size was 2.48, and the average family size was 3.08.

In the city, the age distribution was  under 18,  from 18 to 24, 22.0% from 25 to 44, 20.9% from 45 to 64, and  who were 65 or older. The median age was 39.1 years. For every 100 females, there were 99.2 males. For every 100 females age 18 and over, there were 82.1 males.

Males had a median income of  versus  for females. About 16.2% of families and 18.6% of the population were below the poverty line, including 24.3% of those under age 18 and 11.2% of those age 65 or over.

Religion

 First Baptist Mineola is one of the largest churches in the Wood County area, with enrollment record around 850.
 Sand Springs Baptist Church is located just west of Mineola. The church has a regular Sunday attendance around 350.
 Broad Street Church of Christ
 Mineola First United Methodist Church
 New Hope Baptist Church
 St. Paul Missionary Baptist Church, founded October 1871, in Mineola
 Johnson Chapel United Methodist Church
 Sidney Temple Church of God 
 East Chapel Christian Methodist Episcopal Church
 St. Peter the Apostle Roman Catholic Church is a parish of the Roman Catholic Diocese of Tyler.

Sports

The Mineola Black Spiders were a non-league barnstorming African-American baseball team. In , the Texas Historical Commission erected a historical marker at the corner of Hwy. 69 S and South Johnson Street.

Parks and recreation

Howard L. and Vivian W. Lott House

The Howard L. and Vivian W. Lott House is a house designed in the Prairie School style with classical details. It is a Recorded Texas Historic Landmark and is listed on the National Register of Historic Places.

Mineola Downtown Historic District

Mineola Downtown Historic District is home to a collection of buildings that were constructed between 1885 and 1960.  The district comprises 88 properties and covers almost .

It was added to the National Register of Historic Places on April 16, 2013.

Lakes
 Lake Holbrook – located 4 miles west.
 Lake Fork – located 20 miles north, between the towns of Quitman, Alba, Emory, and Yantis, Texas.

Education
The City of Mineola is served by the Mineola Independent School District.
 Mineola High School

 Historically Black schools
  Mineola Colored High School
  McFarland Elementary

Media 
Newspaper

The Wood County Monitor is a weekly newspaper serving Mineola and Wood County, Texas.  In  , newspaper operations of the Mineola Monitor and the Wood County Democrat were merged by their owner, Bluebonnet Publishing, to form the Wood County Monitor.

Radio

KMOO-FM ( FM, "K-Moo") is a radio station broadcasting a country music format. Licensed to Mineola, Texas, United States, the station serves the Tyler-Longview area.  The station is currently owned by Hightower Radio, Inc.  Studios and transmitter are located in Mineola.

Infrastructure

Transportation

Roads
Mineola includes the intersection of two major U.S. highways; US 69 and US 80 intersect in the downtown area. Texas Highway 37 connects Mineola and Quitman off US 69.

Major highways
  U.S. Highway 69
  U.S. Highway 80

Farm to market roads
  FM 49

State highways

  Texas State Highway 37
  Loop 564 State Highway Loop 564 (large sections are outside city limits)

Railroads

Mineola is currently served by Amtrak's Texas Eagle passenger railway line. The railroad tracks which run through the southern portion of Wood County and through Mineola are currently owned and operated by Union Pacific.

Airports
Mineola is served by two airports:

Mineola Wisner Field is identified as 3F9. This airport was established in 1917, and has been operated by the same family owners since 1926. 
Wood County Airport (Mineola/Quitman Airport) is a public airport owned by Wood County.

Gallery

Notable people

 Willie Brown, former mayor of San Francisco and former speaker of the California Assembly, attended Mineola Colored High School
R.C. Hickman, an American civil rights photographer who documented events for the National Association for the Advancement of Colored People during the 1950s
 Jim Hogg, Texas governor lived in Mineola and his daughter Ima Hogg was born in a house in this city. The house still stands and is marked by a historical marker
 Bryan Hughes, a lawyer in Mineola, has been since 2003 a Republican member of the Texas House of Representatives; in 2017, he became a member of the Texas State Senate
 Bobby Ray Inman, former deputy director of the Central Intelligence Agency, U.S. Naval Admiral, nominated by President Clinton to be secretary of defense of the United States
 William Jesse "Bill" McDonald, a former Texas Ranger, was a storekeeper and then Wood County deputy sheriff  in the late 19th century
 Adam Moore, professional baseball player
 Kacey Musgraves, Grammy-winning country music artist and performer
 Jack Rhodes, influential country music songwriter and inductee in the Nashville Songwriters Hall of Fame
 Noble Willingham, television and film actor known for The Last Picture Show and Walker, Texas Ranger

Notes

References

External links
 
 Mineola.com – Official City Website

 
Cities in Texas
Cities in Wood County, Texas
Populated places established in 1877
1877 establishments in Texas